Rudolf Bredschneider was a Swiss footballer who played for FC Basel. He played mainly in the position as forward, but also as midfielder. 

Between the years 1908 and 1919 Bredscheider played a total of 68 games for Basel, scoring a total of eight goals. 48 of these games were in the Swiss Serie A, three in the Anglo-Cup and 17 were friendly games. He scored six goals in the domestic league, the other two were scored during the test games.

In the 1912–13 season Basel won the Anglo-Cup. Bredscheider was part of the team that won the final on 29 June 1913 in the Hardau Stadium, Zürich against FC Weissenbühl Bern 5–0.

Sources and References
 Rotblau: Jahrbuch Saison 2017/2018. Publisher: FC Basel Marketing AG. 

FC Basel players
Swiss men's footballers
Association football midfielders
Association football forwards
Year of birth missing
Year of death missing